Ed or Edward Carpenter may refer to:
 Edward Carpenter (1844–1929), British socialist poet, anthologist, and an early homosexual activist
 Edward Childs Carpenter (1872–1950), American writer
 Eddie Carpenter (1887–1963), American ice hockey player
 Ed J. Carpenter (1900–1965), American politician, member of the Texas House of Representatives
 Edward Carpenter (priest) (1910–1998), British Anglican priest, dean of Westminster and ecclesiastical historian
 Ed Carpenter (artist), American artist
 Ed Carpenter (racing driver) (born 1981), American open wheel driver
 Ed Carpenter Racing, a racing team
 Ed Carpenter (cricketer) (born 1982), English cricketer
 Ed Carpenter, former member of the band Brand New Sin

See also
Edmund Carpenter (disambiguation)